Andrew Scott Rannells (born August 23, 1978) is an American film, stage, television and voice actor.

Rannells is best known for originating the role of Elder Kevin Price in the 2011 Broadway musical The Book of Mormon for which he was nominated for the Tony Award for Best Performance by a Leading Actor in a Musical and won the 2012 Grammy Award for Best Musical Theater Album. He received his second Tony nomination in 2017 for his performance as Whizzer in the 2016 Broadway revival of Falsettos. Other Broadway credits include Hairspray (2005), Jersey Boys (2009), Hedwig and the Angry Inch (2010), Hamilton (2015), and The Boys in the Band (2018).

In the 2010s, he began working as a screen actor; most notably, he starred in the 2012 NBC sitcom The New Normal and played the recurring role of Elijah in HBO's Girls (2012–2017). In 2019, he began starring in Black Monday on Showtime. He has accumulated numerous voice acting credits since the beginning of his career including currently, Matthew MacDell on Netflix's Big Mouth and William Clockwell on Amazon Prime's Invincible.

Early life 
Rannells was born in Omaha, Nebraska, to Charlotte and Ronald Rannells. He is the fourth of five siblings, with three sisters and an older brother. Rannells attended Our Lady of Lourdes grade school in Omaha, and then Creighton Preparatory School, an all-boys Roman Catholic school in Omaha. His family lived in the Hanscom Park neighborhood in Omaha.

As a child, he took classes at the Emmy Gifford Children's Theater and performed at the Omaha Community Playhouse and the Firehouse Dinner Theatre and the Dundee Dinner Theatre. Rannells was 11 when he acted in his first play. He did community theater with fellow Omahan and Creighton Prep alumnus Conor Oberst. He did voice-over work and commercials, including a 1996 Grease spoof with Amy Adams.

Rannells moved to New York City in 1997 after high school, studying theater at Marymount Manhattan College for two years before he started auditioning full-time and began landing roles.

Career

1994–2002: Early career and voice acting 
Active in community theater, Rannells got his start as a professional actor as a teenager through voice acting. In the mid-1990s, he found work with the animation production company DIC Entertainment through an Omaha casting call. He was subsequently cast in a number of their television productions in main voice roles. He continued to work in the medium for a number of years while pursuing theater. Rannells worked with the New York City-based production company 4Kids Entertainment from 2001 to 2004 and did voice acting for several English dubs of anime series such as Pokémon and Yu-Gi-Oh!, in addition to serving as voice director for the dubs of Kirby: Right Back at Ya! and Sonic X.

One of his first theater roles was as the character James in the touring production of Pokémon Live! from September 2000 to August 2001. When asked about his experience in 2014, he jokingly said that he would have rather starred in a porn film or snuff film instead and that he only took the job for the pay.

Before winning his first Broadway role, Rannells had parts in a number of regional theater productions, including Hedwig and the Angry Inch, Miss Saigon, and Thoroughly Modern Millie. For his turn as Hedwig at the Zachary Scott Theater Center in Austin, Texas, in 2002, he won best actor in a musical at the B. Iden Payne Awards in September 2002, which honor outstanding achievements in Austin theater.

2002–2012: Broadway debut and The Book of Mormon 
In 2002, Rannells made his Broadway debut when he assumed the role of Link Larkin in the Broadway production of Hairspray.

He followed this with some regional performances. He played Bob Gaudio in the First National Tour of Jersey Boys. His last performance with the tour was on December 6, 2008, in Toronto. In January 2009, he reprised the role of Gaudio in the musical's Broadway production.

Rannells had his breakthrough in 2011 when he originated the role of Elder Price in The Book of Mormon, a musical written by South Park creators Trey Parker and Matt Stone and Avenue Q composer Robert Lopez. For his performance, he was nominated for the Tony Award for Best Leading Actor in a Musical. He won the Grammy Award for Best Musical Theater Album for his performance in the musical's Original Broadway Cast Recording. His last performance was June 10, 2012.

2012–present: Work in television and theater 
Rannells played a stripper in the 2012 film Bachelorette and played a lead character, Bryan Collins, in the 2012–13 television series The New Normal. One of his most well known roles, he played the recurring role of Elijah on the HBO television series Girls.

He temporarily replaced Jonathan Groff in the role of King George III in Hamilton on Broadway from October 27 to November 29, 2015, while Groff fulfilled pre-arranged filming commitments.

Rannells played the role of Whizzer Brown in the Broadway revival of Falsettos directed by James Lapine. He was joined by Christian Borle and Stephanie J. Block who played Marvin and Trina, respectively. The musical ran from October 27, 2016 (with previews beginning September 29), to January 8, 2017. He was nominated for the Tony Award for Best Featured Actor in a Musical for his performance.

He played Larry in the 2018 Broadway revival of The Boys in the Band. It was a limited run, in honor of the play's 50th anniversary. It won a Tony Award for Best Revival of a Play. He revived his role (along with the rest of the revival cast) for the film adaptation for Netflix, which was released on September 30, 2020.

Rannells played Blair Pfaff, one of the leading roles on the television show Black Monday. The show premiered on January 20, 2019, on Showtime. In April 2019, the series was renewed for a second season that premiered on March 15, 2020. In October 2020, the series was renewed for a third season which premiered in 2021. In January 2022, it was confirmed by cast member Paul Scheer that the show was cancelled by Showtime.

During this period, he also returned to voice acting; notable credits include main roles in Netflix's Big Mouth (2017–present) and Amazon's Invincible (2021–present). He played Trent Oliver in Netflix's 2020 movie musical The Prom, an adaptation of the Broadway musical of the same name.

Rannells published his first book, a memoir titled Too Much Is Not Enough, in 2019. It is a series of essays about his childhood in Omaha, Nebraska, and his years spent in New York leading up to his 2005 Broadway debut in Hairspray.

He made his directorial debut with season 2 episode 7 of Modern Love, titled How Do You Remember Me? He also wrote the episode, adapting an essay he wrote for the New York Times column (which also appeared in his memoir).

Personal life 
Rannells is gay. Rannells has said he has known he is gay since high school. He came out to his family when he was eighteen, but he stated that "by that point, no one was surprised". He also came out to his theater friends, but not his all-boys Catholic school.

Since 2019, he has been in a relationship with actor Tuc Watkins. The two met the year before while playing a couple on the Broadway production of The Boys in the Band. They reprised their roles for Netflix's film version of the show and also worked together on Black Monday in 2020.

Filmography

Film

Television

Video games

Theatre

Awards and nominations

See also 
 LGBT culture in New York City
 List of LGBT people from New York City

References

External links 

Andrew Rannells at Voice Chasers

1978 births
Living people
American male musical theatre actors
American male stage actors
American male television actors
American male video game actors
American male voice actors
American gay actors
Grammy Award winners
LGBT people from Nebraska
American LGBT singers
Male actors from Omaha, Nebraska
Marymount Manhattan College alumni
20th-century American male actors
21st-century American male actors
21st-century LGBT people